Fists of Bruce Lee, also known as Interpol, is a 1978 film directed by and starring Bruce Lee imitator, Bruce Li.

Synopsis

Bruce Lee (Bruce Li) is assigned to go undercover as Lee Min-Chin to investigate a drug ring. The mob hires an assassin to kill him. They are both great at what they do; as they fight to the death only one will come out alive.

Cast
Bruce Li (Ho Chung Tao) as Bruce Lee/Lee Min-Chin
Lieh Lo
Yuan Chuan
Ping-Ao Wei as Outpuss
Lung Tang
Yi Tao Chang
Fu Mei Po

Reception
JJ Bona of City on fire said: "I think it’s safe to say that the components which make up the visual element of the film (sets, clothes, camerawork & fights) would be much better if we saw the restored/remastered version.
Otherwise, not a bad flick at all (I’ve been through and can think of worse fodder) though I think Ho Chung Tao surpassed himself with The Chinese Stuntman."

References

External links 
 

1978 films
1978 martial arts films
1970s martial arts films
Hong Kong martial arts films
Bruceploitation films
Kung fu films
Martial arts films
1970s Hong Kong films
1980s Hong Kong films